
Mensch, released in August 2002, is the 20th studio album by German rock/pop artist Herbert Grönemeyer. Mensch ("Human") is Grönemeyer's 11th full-length album of original compositions. It is the most successful German-language album to date.

Background
The title track "Mensch" became Grönemeyer's first number-one single in Germany. The mood of the album reflects the then recent death of his wife, Anna Henkel, and Wilhelm, one of his older brothers, both of cancer, within a week, and is rich with poetic imagery. The songs range from rock to ballads. The richness of the imagery and language, as well as the use of creative word play, can make the lyrics difficult to understand and interpret by listeners who are not fluent in German. In Mensch Grönemeyer reflects on his own humanity as it relates to feeling loss. The song "Der Weg" in particular focuses on memories of his wife and the love they shared, while the song "Unbewohnt" is dealing with the loneliness and depression he felt after his wife's death.

The full-length album was released in three versions:

 a copy-protected CD
 a 12" vinyl LP album
 a hybrid Super Audio CD, containing standard compact disc stereo, Super Audio CD high-resolution stereo, and Super Audio CD high-resolution multi-channel audio content.

The compact disc and the Super Audio CD (CD layer and high-resolution SACD stereo sections) contain a hidden track after about fifteen minutes of silence at the end of the last song. The album is almost entirely in German, with the hidden track in English.

Mensch was a huge success in Germany, Austria and Switzerland and sold nearly 4 million copies, making it the best-selling German-language record of all time, also being certified with 21 x Gold in Germany.

Track listing

Charts and certifications

Chart positions

Certifications

Singles

See also
 List of best-selling albums in Germany

References

External links 
 Mensch on Discogs
 CD-Kritik: Herbert Grönemeyer - Mensch rezensator.de

2002 albums
German-language albums
EMI Records albums
Herbert Grönemeyer albums
Albums produced by Alex Silva